Cyprien Baguette (born 12 May 1989) is a Belgian football goalkeeper who currently plays for RSC Brainois.

External links 

Belgian footballers
Association football goalkeepers
1989 births
Living people
R. Charleroi S.C. players
R.W.D.M. Brussels F.C. players
Belgian Pro League players
Challenger Pro League players